Gerris costae  is a Palearctic species of  true bug.   It is aquatic.It is commonly known as the Moorland Pondskater, and has been found in France, Ireland, United Kingdom, The Balkans, and Upper Italy/Switzerland. 
It is also known to have three apparent subspecies:
-Gerris costae costae

-Gerris costae fieberi

-Gerris costae poissoni

References
 

Gerrini
Hemiptera of Europe
Insects described in 1850